Kabadi or Kabaddi may refer to:

Kabaddi, an Indian contact team sport
Punjabi kabaddi, circle style kabaddi
Kabaddi (2009 film), an Indian film
Kabaddi (2014 film), a Nepali film
Kabaddi (2021 film), a Sri Lankan sports action film
Kabadi language of Papua New Guinea

See also
Kabaddi Kabaddi (disambiguation)